No Turning Back may refer to:

Politics
 No Turning Back (political group), a group within the British Conservative Party

Music
 No Turning Back (Burning Starr album), 1986
 No Turning Back (Out of Eden album), 1999
 No Turning Back (Imelda May album), 2003
 No Turning Back (Brandon Heath album), 2015
 No Turning Back, a 1979 album by Kevin Borich Express
 No Turning Back, a 1989 album by Ian Stuart Donaldson
 No Turning Back, a 1990 album by Jimi Hocking's band Jimi the Human & Spectre 7
 No Turning Back, a 1998 album by Jersey (band)
 No Turning Back, a 2003 album by Hilton Schilder
 No Turning Back, a 2005 album by Calyx (musician)
 No Turning Back: 1985–2005, a DVD collection by Glass Tiger
 "No Turning Back", a 1986 single by Blyss feat. Krystal Davis
 "No Turning Back", a 2008 single by This Beautiful Republic
 "No Turning Back", a song on the 1959 EP Serious Charge (EP) by Cliff Richard and the Drifters
 "No Turning Back", a song on the 1980 album The Skill by the Sherbs
 "No Turning Back", a song on the 1986 soundtrack album of Biggles (film)
 "No Turning Back", a song on the 1992 album Live at Budokan (Stormtroopers of Death album)
 "No Turning Back", a song on the 1992 album Mexican Power by Proper Dos
 "No Turning Back", a song on the 1993 album Revelation (Ultravox album)
 "No Turning Back", a song on the 1998 album Destiny (Stratovarius album)
 "No Turning Back", a song on the 2001 album The Anger and the Truth by the Unseen
 "No Turning Back", a song on the 2005 album Trish by Trish Thuy Trang
 "No Turning Back", a song on the 2008 compilation album No Turning Back: The Story So Far by Shannon Noll
 "No Turning Back", a song on the 2009 album As Day Follows Night by Sarah Blasko
 "No Turning Back", a song on the 2012 compilation album Monsters, Vol. 3 by Figure (musician)
 "No Turning Back", a song on the 2012 compilation album Fabric 62 by DJ Sneak
 "No Turning Back", a song on the 2012 album Midnight Theatre by ROMEO
 "No Turning Back", a song on the 2014 album Evolution (Hed PE album)

Television
 "No Turning Back", an episode of Drive (2007 TV series)
 "No Turning Back", an episode of The Beast (2009 TV series)
 "No Turning Back", an episode of the 2009 TV series DietTribe

Literature
 No Turning Back, a 1964 book by Polingaysi Qöyawayma
 No Turning Back: A Novel of South Africa, a 1995 book by Beverley Naidoo
 No Turning Back: The History of Feminism and the Future of Women, a 2002 book by Estelle Freedman
 No Turning Back: The Life and Death of Animal Species, a 2004 book by Richard Ellis (biologist)
 No Turning Back, a 2006 book by Joanne Lees
 No Turning Back: One Man's Inspiring True Story of Courage, Determination, and Hope, a 2011 book by Bryan Anderson (author)
 No Turning Back: Life, Loss, and Hope in Wartime Syria, a 2018 book by Rania Abouzeid

See also
 Best of the Best 3: No Turning Back, a 1995 martial arts action film directed by Phillip Rhee